John Breckin (born 27 July 1953) is an English former professional footballer who played as a left-back. He is the uncle of Nottingham Forest defender Ian Breckin.

References

External links
 

1953 births
Living people
English footballers
Footballers from Sheffield
Association football defenders
Rotherham United F.C. players
Darlington F.C. players
Bury F.C. players
Doncaster Rovers F.C. players
Burton Albion F.C. players
Kiveton Park F.C. players
English Football League players
Rotherham United F.C. managers
English Football League managers
Oldham Athletic A.F.C. non-playing staff
Barnsley F.C. non-playing staff